Paratettix brevipennis, the short-winged pygmy grasshopper, is a species of pygmy grasshopper in the family Tetrigidae. It is found in North America.

References

Tetrigidae
Articles created by Qbugbot
Insects described in 1902